Little Bull Creek is a tributary of Bull Creek and part of the Allegheny River watershed located in both Allegheny and Butler counties in Pennsylvania, U.S.

Course

Little Bull Creek rises in Butler County. It then flows into Allegheny County, generally along the southeastern side of Pennsylvania Route 28. The stream joins Bull Creek via a culvert underneath Bull Creek Road (a section of Pennsylvania Route 366) at the borough of Tarentum.

See also

 List of rivers of Pennsylvania
 List of tributaries of the Allegheny River

References

External links

U.S. Geological Survey: PA stream gaging stations

Rivers of Pennsylvania
Tributaries of the Allegheny River
Rivers of Allegheny County, Pennsylvania
Rivers of Butler County, Pennsylvania